The Prince of Wales Prize for Municipal Heritage Leadership is an award presented annually to a Canadian municipality that has demonstrated a commitment to the conservation of its historic built environment, through regulation, policies, and funding. Created in 1999 by the Heritage Canada Foundation, the award is named for King Charles III, who agreed to lend his title as he has personal interests in architecture and inner-city renewal while he was the prince of wales.

The municipality receives a metal plaque bearing the insignia of the Prince of Wales and the Heritage Canada Foundation, a flag with the same emblems to be flown outside or displayed within the city or town hall, and the prize's logo must be displayed on the municipality's website. In 2008, the first ever Prince of Wales Prize Honourable Mention was awarded.

Recipients
 2000: Markham, Ontario
 2001: Victoria, British Columbia
 2002: Saint John, New Brunswick
 2003: Quebec City, Quebec
 2004: Perth, Ontario
 2005: Charlottetown, Prince Edward Island
 2006: Annapolis Royal, Nova Scotia
 2007: St. John's, Newfoundland and Labrador
 2008:
Winner: Aurora, Ontario
Honourable mention: Saint-Raymond, Quebec
 2009: Edmonton, Alberta
 2010:
Winner: Oakville, Ontario
Honourable mention: Calgary, Alberta
 2013:
Winner: Owen Sound, Ontario

See also
 List of Canadian awards

Notes

External links
 The Heritage Canada Foundation: The Prince of Wales Prize for Municipal Heritage Leadership
 of Oakville receives Prince of Wales Prize

Canadian awards
Nature conservation organizations based in Canada
Charles III